The 2021 Western Australian state election was held on 13 March 2021.

Redistribution and seat changes

A redistribution was completed in 2019. Although no seats notionally changed hands, the Labor-held seat of Girrawheen was renamed Landsdale.

A rearrangement of Labor's Legislative Council tickets saw South Metropolitan MLC Pierre Yang contest North Metropolitan, while North Metropolitan MLC Alannah MacTiernan contested South West.

Shooters, Fishers and Farmers Agricultural MLC Rick Mazza contested South West.

Retiring MPs

Labor
Janine Freeman MLA (Mirrabooka) – announced 25 November 2020
Josie Farrer MLA (Kimberley) – announced 18 August 2020
Fran Logan MLA (Cockburn) – announced 31 August 2020
Mick Murray MLA (Collie-Preston) – announced 9 February 2020
Peter Watson MLA (Albany) – announced 10 February 2020
Ben Wyatt MLA (Victoria Park) – announced 16 November 2020
Adele Farina MLC (South West) – lost preselection, announced retirement 26 June 2020
Laurie Graham MLC (Agricultural) – announced 21 July 2020

Liberal
John McGrath MLA (South Perth) – announced 30 October 2019
Mike Nahan MLA (Riverton) – announced 2 December 2019
Dean Nalder MLA (Bateman) – announced 1 December 2020
Ken Baston MLC (Mining and Pastoral) – announced 2 December 2019
Simon O'Brien MLC (South Metropolitan) – lost preselection 3 February 2020, did not renominate

Nationals
Jacqui Boydell MLC (Mining and Pastoral) – announced 21 February 2020
Colin Holt MLC (South West) – announced 19 August 2020

Greens
Robin Chapple MLC (Mining and Pastoral) – announced 27 February 2020

Legislative Assembly
Incumbent members are shown in bold text. Successful candidates are highlighted in the relevant colour.

Legislative Council

Six candidates are elected in each region. Incumbent members are shown in bold text. Tickets that elected at least one MLC are highlighted in the relevant colour. Successful candidates are identified by an asterisk (*).

Agricultural region
The Labor Party was defending two seats. The Liberal Party was defending one seat. The National Party was defending two seats. The Shooters, Fishers and Farmers Party was defending one seat.

East Metropolitan Region
The Labor Party was defending three seats. The Liberal Party was defending one seat. The Greens were defending one seat. One Nation was defending one seat, although sitting MLC Charles Smith defected to the Western Australia Party.

Mining and Pastoral Region
The Labor Party was defending two seats. The Liberal Party was defending one seat. The National Party was defending one seat. The Greens were defending one seat. One Nation was defending one seat.

North Metropolitan Region
The Labor Party was defending two seats. The Liberal Party was defending three seats. The Greens were defending one seat.

South Metropolitan Region
The Labor Party was defending three seats. The Liberal Party was defending two seats. The Liberal Democrats were defending one seat.

South West Region
The Labor Party was defending two seats. The Liberal Party was defending one seat. The National Party was defending one seat. The Greens were defending one seat. One Nation was defending one seat.

Disendorsed candidates prior to close of nominations

Notes

References

Candidates for Western Australian state elections